The 2013 Palarong Pambansa, also known as the 2013 PALARO, was the 56th edition of the annual multi-sporting event, held in Dumaguete, Philippines, from April 21 to 27, 2013. Around 10,000 student athletes from 17 regions of the Philippines competed for the tournament, while the announced gold medalists and record breakers of this year received cash prizes for the first time. The motto for this edition was Sports: Road to Peace and Progress,
promoting education, health, development and peace.

Background
In its 56 years, it was the first time for the biggest sporting event for student athletes in the Philippines to be held and hosted by Dumaguete. In addition, it was also the first time in its history that the private sector offered financial rewards and scholarships to those who performed exceptionally. Furthermore, some college and university sport officials and coaches were scouting for their future athletes during the event.

Bidding
On October 13, the officials of Department of Education and the Philippine Sports Commission have had a tedious selection and deliberation process of deciding where to host the 2013 event, taking into consideration the presentations made and the reports provided by the technical committee. The next month, the Department of Education officially gave the rights of hosting the 2013 Palarong Pambansa to Dumaguete after winning 11-7 votes for the province and a one-tied vote. There were 19 Palarong Pambansa Board Members who cast their votes.

Venues 

The opening and closing ceremonies of the 56th Palarong Pambansa were held at the Gov. Mariano Perdices Memorial Stadium, Dumaguete, Negros Oriental. Other venues are listed below:

Broadcasting and media 
The 56th edition of Palarong Pambansa became more known as it was partnered with the media for coverage and live updates of the sports events. PTV-4 or People's Television Network signed an agreement with the Department of Education to provide airtime as well as to telecast the daily events of the 2013 Palarong Pambansa highlights and updates. At the same time, the Department of Education teamed up with Rappler as its official social media partner for 2013. This is the second consecutive year for both PTV-4 and Rappler to cover the yearly sporting event after the first in Lingayen, Pangasinan in 2012.

On the other hand, the event's official website and Facebook pages were managed by the local events Secretariat headed by Mr. Adolf P. Aguilar, the general events coordinator of the Palarong Pambansa. For the media bureau, the student volunteers from Silliman University and Foundation University were the ones to manage. Aside from the Facebook fanpage ("Palarong Pambansa 2013") and the Twitter account (@DepEd_PH), which were updated every second, there was also the live streaming, courtesy of Ustream, to provide more coverage of the games.

A total of 200 ICT teachers in Negros Oriental were tapped to cover the various sporting events, making it the most photographed and most interactive Palarong Pambansa in history to date.

Sports 
The 2013 Palarong Pambansa featured 17 sports in the 368 events. The 56th edition of the games was historical because of its demonstration sports, which includes Futsal, billiards, and Wushu.

1demonstration sports

Participating regions

Billeting locations
The seventeen participating regions of the 2013 Palarong Pambansa were housed in different billeting locations around Dumaguete city. Public and private schools served as the billeting areas for athletes and coaches including medical staff and teachers. Below are the billeting quarters during the game:

Medal tally 
The following list is the final medal tally as of April 27, 2013.

Point system by DepEd

Criticisms and concerns
Before the 2013 Palarong Pambansa began, an estimate of 170 student athletes was reported to be affected by diarrhea. In fact, the majority of the victims were high school students from Region 8. Headaches and vomiting were observed and some affected athletes and officials were immediately brought to a nearby hospital in Dumaguete city. Apparently, food poisoning and drinking unclean water were the possible causes of the incident. In response, an investigation has been done and results were likely to come out. Food preparation is not the responsibility of the host province but of the visiting regions themselves.

Moreover, Athletics became intense when Region 12 (or CRAA/SOCCKSARGEN) made a protest in the "Secondary Boys - 100m" running event. A photo finish was requested to determine the winner of the race more accurately, but there was only one recorded video available for the edition that was not able to capture the finish of the said race. Thus, Christopher Lirazan of Region 6 (or Western Visayas) and Romnick Nor of Region 12/CRAA were in dispute for the gold medal.

At the end of the competition, the only region that failed to maintain its perennial top three finish at the medal tally and the DepEd point system was Region 4A (or STCAA - Calabarzon). On the other hand, regional powerhouse NCR (or NCRAA) and Region 6 (or WVRAA) were able to keep their positions as the number one and two teams of 2013 respectively. The host (Region VII - CVRAA) claimed the third spot in the point system, while Region 10 (or NMRAA) was third place in the medal tally.

References

External links 
 2013 Palarong Pambansa official website
 2013 Palarong Pambansa Special Coverage by Rappler.com
Department of Education

Palarong Pambansa
2013 in multi-sport events
Palarong
Sports in Negros Oriental
Dumaguete
April 2013 sports events in the Philippines